Stefanus "Steve" Orateng Mogotsi (born 26 December 1961) is a Namibian politician and former featherweight boxer. 

A member of SWAPO, Mogotsi won a seat in the Regional Council of Omaheke Region in 2004. He was subsequently selected to the 3rd National Council of Namibia. The seat, representing Kalahari Constituency, had been held by the Democratic Turnhalle Alliance since 1992.

Early life and education 
Mogotsi was born in Aminuis, Omaheke Region. He was a featherweight boxing champion and a winger for the Namibian rugby union team in 2011. He joined SWAPO in 1978, while studying at St. Joseph's High School in Döbra.

Career
He became increasingly involved in politics when he worked at Consolidated Diamond Mines (CDM) in Oranjemund, ǁKaras Region. At CDM, Mogotsi became the shop steward for the Mineworkers Union of Namibia. 

In 1994, Mogotsi moved permanently back to Omaheke Region, the region of his birth, to become a full-time commercial farmer and building contractor. 

In 1998, Mogotsi contested the Kalahari constituency, but lost to the DTA candidate. Six years later, Mogotsi won the seat. 

In 2005, he was selected to the cabinet of Hifikepunye Pohamba as Deputy Minister of Works, Transport and Communication following the resignation of Paulus Kapia. With this appointment Mogotsi became the first ethnic Tswana to serve in any Namibian cabinet.

References

1961 births
Living people
People from Omaheke Region
Tswana people
SWAPO politicians
Government ministers of Namibia
Members of the National Council (Namibia)
Namibian businesspeople
Featherweight boxers
Namibian male boxers